Aparekka is a village in Matara District, a southern province of Sri Lanka.

Legend of Name
During the early days of fighting between King Dutugemunu and Elara, King Dutugemunu suffered many defeats. After one such defeat, he escaped from the enemy in disguise and travelled alone. He came to an old hut and asked for refuge. An old lady who lived in the hut asked him in. She had prepared her meal and shared it with the disguised King. The rice & coconut (Hunsal Bath) was steaming hot and the hungry king burnt his fingers trying to eat his meal. Seeing this, the old lady laughed and said "he’s eating his rice in the same way the king is fighting the war. Attacking here and there and getting burnt". She told him to start from a corner and mix the rice with onion sambol (Lunu miris) and eat. The king thanked the old lady for the meal and left. The words of the old lady caused King Dutugemunu to rethink his strategy. He stopped attacking at different points. He developed his army, collected rations for a long period, and persevered in attacking the enemy with sustained pressure at a single point. After defeating Elara, King Dutugemunu visited the old lady and gave her a tract of land to live on, and created a village there and named it Apa-Rekka, "person who saved us".

Populated places in Matara District
Populated places in Southern Province, Sri Lanka